Hilden railway station is located in Lisburn, County Antrim, Northern Ireland. The station opened on 1 May 1907.

Service
Extra services run at peak times, and the service reduces to hourly operation in the evenings.

On Sundays there is an hourly service in each direction.

References

External links
 

Railway stations in County Antrim
Railway stations opened in 1907
Railway stations served by NI Railways
Railway stations in Northern Ireland opened in the 20th century